The Quack is a 1982 Polish drama film directed by Jerzy Hoffman. The screenplay was written based on the novel by Tadeusz Dołęga-Mostowicz written in 1937. The first adaptation of the book was filmed the same year the book was written (The Quack, directed by Michał Waszyński).

The film was shot near Bielsk Podlaski.

Plot 

Professor Rafał Wilczur (Jerzy Bińczycki) was a successful surgeon in Poland in the early 20th century, whose wife leaves him with their small daughter for another man. Wilczur meets a man named Samuel who asks Wilczur to help him financially. The two men go to a bar and get drunk. Wilczur gets robbed and beaten up and loses his memory after hitting his head. Suffering from amnesia, he ends up in a small village, working as a farm laborer for years and is known there as Kosiba. He eventually starts healing the other villagers, and performs surgery on an injured young woman Maria (Anna Dymna). The existing doctor in the area (Andrzej Kopiczyński) sues Wilczur for using the doctor's surgical instruments. In court for this case, he is recognized as the missing famous surgeon by an expert witness Dobraniecki in the case (Piotr Fronczewski), and he then begins to retain his memory. He then realizes that the young woman he saved is his daughter, and the two are reunited. He is told that his former wife died of tuberculosis shortly after leaving him, and the daughter ended up in an orphanage. Maria then marries Leszek (Tomasz Stockinger), the son of a local nobleman.

Cast 

 Jerzy Bińczycki – Professor Rafał Wilczur / Antoni Kosiba, aka The Quack
 Anna Dymna – Maria Jolanta Wilczur and Beata Wilczur
 Tomasz Stockinger – Leszek Czyński
 Bernard Ładysz – Prokop
 Piotr Fronczewski – Professor Dobraniecki
  – Zenek
 Artur Barciś – Wasylko, son of Prokop
 Andrzej Kopiczyński – Doctor Pawlicki
  – Witalis, Prokop's farmhand
 Irena Burawska – Prokop's wife
 Genowefa Korska
 Tadeusz Kożusznik – Franciszek, butler of the Czyński family
 Remigiusz Rogacki
 Bożena Dykiel – Sonia, Prokop's daughter in law
 Igor Śmiałowski – Count Czyński, Leszek's father
 Maria Homerska – Countess Czyńska, Leszek's mother
 Andrzej Szalawski – chairman of the court
 Jerzy Braszka
 Jerzy Trela – Samuel Obiedziński
 Gustaw Lutkiewicz – police leader
 Henryk Dudziński
 Włodzimierz Adamski – Zenek's comrade
 Arkadiusz Bazak – public prosecutor

External links 

1982 drama films
1982 films
Medical-themed films
Polish drama films
Films directed by Jerzy Hoffman
Films based on works by Tadeusz Dołęga-Mostowicz
1980s Polish-language films